Xorides ater is a parasitoid wasp from ichneumonid family that parasitizes long-horned beetles of next species and subspecies: Tetropium castaneum,  Arhopalus rusticus rusticus.

References

Xoridinae
Taxa named by Johann Ludwig Christian Gravenhorst
Insects described in 1829